Julietta is a 1953 French romantic comedy film directed by Marc Allégret and starring Dany Robin, Jean Marais and Jeanne Moreau. The film was based on a novel of Louise de Vilmorin. In United Kingdom the film was known under the title "Julieta" (Mexico), "Biljett till Paris" (Sweden), "Il peccato di Giulietta" (Italy), "Ștrengărița" (Romania).

It was shot at the Billancourt Studios with sets designed by the art director Jean d'Eaubonne.

Cast 
 Dany Robin as Juliette Valendor
 Jean Marais as André Landrecourt, avocat
 Jeanne Moreau as Rosie Facibey, girlfriend of André
 Denise Grey as Mme Valendor, mother
 Bernard Lancret as prince Hector of Alpen
 Nicole Berger as Martine Valendor, sister of Juliet
 Georges Chamarat as Arthur, l'intendant
 François Joux as Le commissaire
 Georges Sauval as Le contrôleur
 Louis Saintève as L'homme sortant des toilettes du train
 Alain Terrane
 Renée Barell

Production 
The film was important in the career of Roger Vadim. His mentor Marc Allegret was directing with Jean Marais to star. Vadim says a week before filming Marais refused to do the movie as he was unhappy with the script. Vadim rewrote the script to the star's satisfaction. The movie was a big success. Vadim and Allegret tried to have Vadim's wife Brigitte Bardot cast as the female lead but the producer went with the better known Dany Robin. However this led to Vadim being given the job of rewriting Naughty Girl which turned Bardot into a star.

References

Bibliography 
 Judith Thissen & Clemens Zimmerman. Cinema Beyond the City. Bloomsbury Publishing, 2017.

External links 
 
 Julietta (1953) at the Films de France

1953 films
French romantic comedy-drama films
1950s French-language films
French black-and-white films
Films directed by Marc Allégret
1950s romantic comedy-drama films
Films shot at Billancourt Studios
1953 comedy films
1953 drama films
1950s French films